Heinrich Wilhelm "Heinz" Rühmann (7 March 1902 – 3 October 1994) was a German film actor who appeared in over 100 films between 1926 and 1993. He is one of the most famous and popular German actors of the 20th century, and is considered a German film legend. Rühmann is best known for playing the part of a comic ordinary citizen in film comedies such as Three from the Filling Station and The Punch Bowl. During his later years, he was also a respected character actor in films such as The Captain from Köpenick and It Happened in Broad Daylight. His only English-speaking movie was Ship of Fools in 1964.

Biography

Early life 
Rühmann was born in Essen as the son of a restaurateur. His father Hermann Rühmann moved to Berlin in 1915, where he probably committed suicide a little later. The exact circumstances of death could never be clarified. His son Heinz began his acting career during the early 1920s and appeared in numerous theatres in Germany during the following years. His role in the 1930 movie Die Drei von der Tankstelle (The Three from the Filling Station) led him to film stardom. He remained highly popular as a comedic actor (and sometime singer) throughout the 1930s and early 1940s. He remained in Germany and continued to work during the Nazi period, as did his friend and colleague, Hans Albers.

Career during the Third Reich 
During the 1933-45 period, he acted in 37 films and directed four. After January 1933, Rühmann did not speak openly about German politics, but instead kept himself as neutral as possible. He never stated a word against or towards the Nazis in the press, although he had been a supporter of democracy. In 1938, he divorced his Jewish wife Maria, who then left Germany and travelled to Stockholm where she married a Swedish actor. The divorce caused Rühmann to be accused by some of wanting to secure his career; however, the marriage had probably already fallen apart, and some sources say that he wanted to protect his wife with the divorce. After 1945, Bernheim defended her ex-husband against accusations of opportunism. His second wife, Hertha Feiler, whom he married shortly after, had a Jewish grandfather, a fact that caused Rühmann problems with the Nazi cultural authorities. Rühmann retained his reputation as an apolitical star during the entire Nazi era.

During the war years, Rühmann, like others, was co-opted by the State in some films. His role as lead actor in the comedy Quax the Crash Pilot was supposed to distract the populace from the war. In 1941, under the direction of Reichsfilmkammer president Carl Froelich, Rühmann played the title role in Der Gasmann, about a gas-meter reader who is suspected of foreign espionage. In 1944, the premiere of Die Feuerzangenbowle was forbidden by the Nazi film censor for "disrespect for authority". Through his good relationships with the regime, however, Rühmann was able to screen the film in public. He brought the film to the Führerhauptquartier Wolfsschanze for a private screening for Hermann Göring and others. Afterward, Göring was able to get the ban on the film lifted by Adolf Hitler. A nostalgic comedy of mistaken identities, the film was probably the most popular film of his career and later became a cult hit among college students. As a "state actor", the highest title for an actor during the Nazi era, Rühmann was not drafted into the Wehrmacht. He did have to take the basic training to become a military pilot of the reserves (as he happened to be a hobbyist pilot anyway), but for the State, Rühmann was more valuable as an actor and he was spared having to take part in the war effort. In August 1944, Joseph Goebbels put Rühmann on the Gottbegnadeten list of indispensable actors.

Rühmann was a favorite actor of Holocaust diarist Anne Frank, who pasted his picture on the wall of her room in her family's hiding place during the war, where it can still be seen today. The enormous range of Rühmann's popularity during the Nazi era is illustrated by the fact that he was also a favorite actor of Adolf Hitler and his propaganda minister Joseph Goebbels.

Postwar career 
Rühmann had a difficult time resuming his career after the war, but by the mid-1950s, the former comedian had established himself again as a star, only this time as Germany's leading character actor.  In 1956, Rühmann starred in the title role of the internationally acclaimed picture Der Hauptmann von Köpenick (The Captain of Köpenick), the true story of a Prussian cobbler, Wilhelm Voigt, who dressed up as an army officer and took over the town hall in Köpenick. In the days of the German Empire, the army had an exalted status and Voigt embarrassed the army officers and civil servants who obeyed him without question. Rühmann was also the leading man in the 1960 film version of The Adventures of the Good Soldier Schweik, after the novel by Czech author Jaroslav Hašek. He also played the role of Father Brown in three German films during the 1960s. In 1965, Rühmann was brought to Hollywood by producer Stanley Kramer for a supporting role as a German Jew in his all-star movie Ship of Fools.

His wife Hertha Feiler died in 1970 and Rühmann married his third wife Hertha Droemer in 1974. In his later years, he also worked as a recitator for German television. His last film was Faraway, So Close! (1993) by Wim Wenders, in which he played an old fatherly chauffeur named Konrad. Rühmann died in October 1994, aged 92 years. He was buried in Berg-Aufkirchen, Bavaria. His popularity with German audiences continues: In 1995, he was posthumously awarded the Goldene Kamera as the "Greatest German Actor of the Century"; in 2006, a poll voted him number one in the ZDF TV-show Unsere Besten – Favorite German Actors.

Awards
 1938: Venice Film Festival: Medal for his acting in Der Mustergatte
 1940: Appointed Staatsschauspieler by the Third Reich
 1940: Honorary Membership in the Danish Flight Club 
 1957: Golden Gate Award (Best Actor) for Der Hauptmann von Köpenick
 1957: Kunstpreis der Stadt Berlin
 1957: Filmband in Gold as Best Leading Actor for Der Hauptmann von Köpenick
 1959: Ernst-Lubitsch-Preis
 1961: Preis der deutschen Filmkritik (Award of German Film Critics) 1961: Filmband in Gold as Best Leading Actor for Das schwarze Schaf 1962, 1963, 1964, 1965, 1967, 1968, 1969, 1971, 1972, 1973, 1978, 1984: A total of twelve Bambi Awards
 1965: Großes Verdienstkreuz des Verdienstordens der Bundesrepublik Deutschland
 1966: Silberner Bildschirm by the film magazine TV-Hören und Sehen
 1967, 1968: Two Goldener Bildschirm by the film magazine TV-Hören und Sehen
 1972: Großes Verdienstkreuz des Verdienstordens der Bundesrepublik Deutschland mit Stern
 1972: Filmband in Gold for his "long and outstanding work" in German Film
 1972: Goldene Leinwand (Special Award) for extraordinary merits
 1972: Honorary Medal by the Spitzenorganisation der Filmwirtschaft (SPIO) for Lifetime Achievement
 1977: Großes Verdienstkreuz des Verdienstordens der Bundesrepublik Deutschland mit Stern und Schulterband
 1977: Cultural Honorary Award by the City of München
 1981: Bayerischer Maximiliansorden für Wissenschaft und Kunst
 1982: Chaplin-Stock in Silver by the Association of German Film Critics 
 1982: Goldene Ehrenmünze der Landeshauptstadt München
 1986: Bayerischer Filmpreis: Honorary Award
 1989: Appointment as Professor honoris causa by the Kunst und Wissenschaft of North Rhine-Westphalia
 1990: Goldene Berolina
 1992: Magdeburger Otto for Lifetime Achievement
 1995: Goldene Kamera as the Greatest German Actor of the Century (posthumous)
 2006: Voted No. 1 in the ZDF TV-show Unsere Besten – Favorite German Actors (results by a poll)

Filmography
FilmThe Heart of a German Mother (1926) (with Margarete Kupfer) as OscarThe Girl with the Five Zeros (1927, screenplay by Béla Balázs, directed by Curtis Bernhardt) (with Adele Sandrock)The Three from the Filling Station (1930) (with Lilian Harvey, Willy Fritsch, Olga Chekhova, Oskar Karlweis, and the Comedian Harmonists) as HansBurglars (1930) (with Lilian Harvey, Willy Fritsch, Ralph Arthur Roberts, and Oskar Sima) as Victor SérignyThe Man in Search of His Murderer (1931, directed by Robert Siodmak) as Hans HerfortBombs on Monte Carlo (1931) (with Hans Albers, Anna Sten, and Peter Lorre) as First Officer Lt. Peter SchmidtMy Wife, the Impostor (1931) (with Käthe von Nagy, Fritz Grünbaum, Theo Lingen, and Fritz Alberti) as Peter Bergmann, BankbeamterThe Virtuous Sinner (1931, directed by Fritz Kortner) (with Max Pallenberg and Dolly Haas) as WittekNo Money Needed (1931) (with Hans Moser and Hedy Lamarr) as Heinz SchmidtThe Pride of Company Three (1932) (with Anton Walbrook and Rudolf Platte) as Gustav DiestelbeckThings Are Getting Better Already (1932) (with Dolly Haas and Fritz Grünbaum) as Ingenieur Fred HolmerSpoiling the Game (1932) as Willy Streblow, RennfahrerThe Empress and I (1933, directed by Friedrich Hollaender) (with Conrad Veidt, Lilian Harvey and Mady Christians) as DidierLaughing Heirs (1933, directed by Max Ophüls) (with Max Adalbert) as Peter FrankHomecoming to Happiness (1933) (with Luise Ullrich and Paul Hörbiger) as AmadoriThree Bluejackets and a Blonde (1933) as Kadett Heini Jäger
 There Is Only One Love (1933) (with Louis Graveure and Jenny Jugo) as Ballettmeister Eddy BlattnerThe Grand Duke's Finances (1934, Directed by Gustaf Gründgens) (with Viktor de Kowa, Fritz Alberti, and Theo Lingen) as Pelotard
 Such a Rascal (1934) (with ) as Dr. Hans Pfeiffer / Erich Pfeiffer (1934) as August Pipin (1934) (with Louis Graveure, Camilla Horn, Adele Sandrock, and Theo Lingen) as Benjamin Cortes, KomponistHeinz in the Moon (1934) (with Annemarie Sörensen, Rudolf Platte, Oskar Sima, and Jarmila Novotná and Hans Moser) as Aristides NesselFrasquita (Austria, 1934) as HippolitHeaven on Earth (Austria, 1935) (with Theo Lingen, Hans Moser, Adele Sandrock, Hermann Thimig, Rudolf Carl, and Lizzi Holzschuh) as Peter Hilpert (1935) as Paul Normann, der kleine Angestellte (Austria, 1935) (with Magda Schneider, Hans Söhnker, Hans Moser, and Adele Sandrock) as Willibald RiegeleDer Außenseiter (1935), as Peter BangUngeküsst soll man nicht schlafen gehn (Austria, 1936) (with Theo Lingen, Hans Moser, and Liane Haid) as Franz AngererTomfoolery (1936, directed by Willi Forst) (with Anton Walbrook, Renate Müller, and Jenny Jugo) as DavidIf We All Were Angels (1936) as Christian KempenichLumpaci the Vagabond (Austria, 1936, based on a play by Johann Nestroy) (with Paul Hörbiger, Hans Holt, Hilde Krahl, and Fritz Imhoff) as Schneidergeselle Zwirn (Austria, 1937) (with Hans Moser, Theo Lingen, and Gusti Huber) as Toni MathisThe Man Who Was Sherlock Holmes (1937, directed by Karl Hartl) (with Hans Albers) as Macky McPhersonThe Model Husband (1937) (with Leny Marenbach and Hans Söhnker) as Billy BartlettThe Roundabouts of Handsome Karl (1938) (with Sybille Schmitz) as Karl Kramer, KellnerFive Million Look for an Heir (1938) (with Leny Marenbach, and Oskar Sima) as Peter Pett / Patrick PettThirteen Chairs (1938, based on the novel "The Twelve Chairs") (with Hans Moser) as Friseur Felix RabeSo You Don't Know Korff Yet? (1938) (with Victor Janson, Fritz Rasp) as Niels KorffThe Leghorn Hat (1939) as Theo FarinaBachelor's Paradise (1939) (with Hans Brausewetter and Josef Sieber) as Hugo Bartels, StandesbeamterHurrah! I'm a Father (1939) as Student Peter OhlsenClothes Make the Man (1940, based on a short story by Gottfried Keller, directed by Helmut Käutner) (with Hertha Feiler and Erich Ponto) as Schneidergeselle WenzelHappiness Is the Main Thing (1941) (directed by Theo Lingen) as Axel RothThe Gasman (1941) (with Anny Ondra) as Hermann KnittelQuax the Crash Pilot (1941) as Otto Groschenbügel, 'Quax'Front Theatre (1942) as Himself (uncredited)I Entrust My Wife to You (1943) as Peter Trost
 Sophienlund (1943) as DirectorDie Feuerzangenbowle (1944) (with Erich Ponto (Professor Crey, Schnauz), Paul Henckels (Professor Bömmel), Hans Leibelt (Direktor Knauer, Zeus), Karin Himboldt (Eva Knauer), and Hilde Sessak (Marion)) as Dr. Johannes Pfeiffer / Hans PfeifferQuax in Afrika (1945) (directed by Helmut Weiss, book: Hermann Grote) (with Bruni Löbel and Beppo Brem) as Otto Groschenbügel, 'Quax', FluglehrerTell the Truth (1946) (with Georg Thomalla and Susanne von Almassy) (unfinished film) (1948, directed by Heinz Hilpert) (with Anneliese Römer, Hans Cossy) as Herr vom anderen Stern (1949, directed by Helmut Weiss) (with Gustav Knuth) as André (1949, directed by Sándor Szlatinay) as Peter KrügerThat Can Happen to Anyone (1952, directed by Paul Verhoeven) (with Gustav Knuth, Gisela Schmidting, and Liesl Karlstadt) as Hugo Brinkmeyer
 Shame on You, Brigitte! (1952) (with Hans Moser, Theo Lingen, Nadja Tiller, Margarete Slezak, and Hilde Berndt) as Dr. Felix SchneiderNot Afraid of Big Animals (1953) (with Gustav Knuth) as Emil KellerMailman Mueller (1953, directed by Heinz Rühmann) (with Heli Finkenzeller) as Titus MüllerOn the Reeperbahn at Half Past Midnight (1954) (with Hans Albers and Gustav Knuth) as Pittes Breuer
 Stopover in Orly (1955, directed by Jean Dréville) (with Dany Robin, Dieter Borsche, Simone Renant, and Claus Biederstaedt) as Albert PetitWenn der Vater mit dem Sohne (1955) (with Oliver Grimm and Waltraut Haas) as Teddy LemkeCharley's Aunt (1956) (with Hertha Feiler, Claus Biederstaedt, Walter Giller, and Paul Hörbiger) as Dr. Otto DernburgThe Captain from Köpenick (1956, based upon the play by Carl Zuckmayer) (directed by Helmut Käutner) as Wilhelm Voigt (1956, directed by Kurt Meisel) (with Walter Giller, Günther Lüders, Werner Peters, and Siegfried Lowitz) as Anton WibbelVater sein dagegen sehr (1957, directed by Kurt Meisel) (with Marianne Koch) as Lutz VenturaIt Happened in Broad Daylight (1958, screenplay by Friedrich Dürrenmatt, directed by Ladislao Vajda) (with Gert Fröbe, Michel Simon, Siegfried Lowitz, Ewald Balser, Berta Drews, and Sigfrit Steiner) as Oberleutnant Matthäi
 The Man Who Couldn't Say No (1958) (with Hannelore Schroth and Siegfried Lowitz) as Thomas TräumerThe Crammer (1958, directed by Axel von Ambesser) (with Wera Frydtberg, Gert Fröbe, Klaus Löwitsch, and Peter Kraus) as Dr. Hermann Seidel
 Iron Gustav (1958, directed by Georg Hurdalek) (with Lucie Mannheim, Ernst Schröder, Karin Baal, Ingrid van Bergen) as Gustav HartmannMenschen im Hotel (1959, based on a novel by Vicki Baum, directed by Gottfried Reinhardt) (with Michèle Morgan, O. W. Fischer, Gert Fröbe, and Sonja Ziemann) as Carl KringeleinThe Man Who Walked Through the Wall (1959, directed by Ladislao Vajda) (with Nicole Courcel and Hubert von Meyerinck) as Herr BuchsbaumThe Juvenile Judge (1960) (with Karin Baal) as Judge Dr. Ferdinand Bluhme
 My Schoolfriend (1960, directed by Robert Siodmak) (with Robert Graf, Ernst Schröder, Mario Adorf, Loni von Friedl, and Fritz Wepper) as Ludwig FuchsThe Good Soldier Schweik (1960, based on the novel The Good Soldier Švejk by Jaroslav Hašek, directed by Axel von Ambesser) (with Ernst Stankovski, Senta Berger, Jane Tilden, Fritz Eckhardt, and Fritz Muliar) as Josef SchwejkThe Black Sheep (1960, a Father Brown film) (with Karl Schönböck, Maria Sebaldt, and Siegfried Lowitz) as Pater BrownThe Liar (1961, directed by Ladislao Vajda) (with Gustav Knuth) as Sebastian SchumannMax the Pickpocket (1962) (with Elfie Pertramer, Hans Clarin, and Ruth Stephan) as Max Schilling
 He Can't Stop Doing It (1962) (a Father Brown film, directed by Axel von Ambesser) (with Rudolf Forster, Grit Boettcher, Ruth Maria Kubitschek, and Horst Tappert) as Pater Brown
 My Daughter and I (1963) (with Gertraud Jesserer, Gustav Knuth, Agnes Windeck, and Herta Staal) as Dr. Robert StegemannThe House in Montevideo (1963, based on a play by Curt Goetz, directed by Helmut Käutner) (with Ruth Leuwerik and Paul Dahlke) as Prof. Dr. Traugott Hermann NäglerA Mission for Mr. Dodd (1964) (with Anton Diffring and Mario Adorf) as Dr. Lancelot Dodd / Dr. Ivor MarmionPraetorius (1965, based on a play by Curt Goetz) (with Liselotte Pulver) as Dr. Hiob PrätoriusShip of Fools (1965, directed by Stanley Kramer) (with Vivien Leigh, Simone Signoret, Oskar Werner, Lee Marvin, José Ferrer, and George Segal) as Julius LowenthalWho Wants to Sleep? (1965, anthology film) (with Curd Jürgens, Nadja Tiller, Ivan Desny, Letícia Román, Gert Fröbe, Catherine Deneuve, Johanna von Koczian, Richard Münch, Anita Ekberg, Peter Alexander, and Axel von Ambesser) as Professor HellbergHocuspocus (1966, based on a play by Curt Goetz) (with Liselotte Pulver and Richard Münch) as Peer BilleYour Money or Your Life (1966, directed by Jean-Pierre Mocky) (with Fernandel) as Henry SchmidtOnce a Greek (1966, based on the novel Once a Greek by Friedrich Dürrenmatt) (with Irina Demick, Hannes Messemer, and Charles Régnier), as Archilochos
 Maigret and His Greatest Case (1966, based on a novel by Georges Simenon) (with Françoise Prévost, Günter Strack, Eddi Arent, and Ulli Lommel) as Kommissar MaigretOperation St. Peter's (1967, directed by Lucio Fulci) (with Edward G. Robinson, Jean-Claude Brialy, and Lando Buzzanca) as Cardinal Erik Braun (1968) (with Charles Régnier) as Dr. AlexanderThe Captain (1971) (with Johanna Matz, Horst Tappert, Ernst Stankovski, Horst Janson, Günter Pfitzmann, and Teri Tordai, music: James Last) as Wilhelm Ebbs (1973) (with Paul Dahlke, Peter Fricke, and Franziska Oehme) as Konsul Jonathan ReynoldHeinz Rühmann erzählt Märchen (1975) as Narrator (1977) (with Senta Berger, Harald Leipnitz, Peter Pasetti, and Christian Kohlund) as Poliakoff (1977, directed by Michael Verhoeven) (with Mario Adorf, René Deltgen, Elisabeth Volkmann, Karin Baal, and Joachim Fuchsberger) as Alfred EisenhardtFaraway, So Close! (1993, directed by Wim Wenders) (with Otto Sander, Bruno Ganz, Nastassja Kinski, Willem Dafoe, Peter Falk, Horst Buchholz, and Solveig Dommartin) as Konrad (final film role)

As directorAll Lies (1938) (1940)Sophienlund (1943) (1944)Die kupferne Hochzeit (1948)

AutobiographyDas war's. Erinnerungen. Ullstein, Berlin 1994, 

Sources
 Franz J. Görtz, Hans Sarkowicz: Heinz Rühmann 1902 - 1994. Der Schauspieler und sein Jahrhundert. Beck, Munich (2001) 
 Torsten Körner: Ein guter Freund: Heinz Rühmann. Aufbau-Verlag, Berlin (2003) 
 Hans-Ulrich Prost: Das war Heinz Rühmann. Bastei, Bergisch Gladbach (1994) 
 Fred Sellin: Ich brech die Herzen..., das Leben des Heinz Rühmann. Rowohlt, Reinbek (2001) 
 Gregor Ball, Eberhard Spiess,  (Hrsg.): Heinz Rühmann und seine Filme. Goldmann, Munich (1985) 
 Hans Hellmut Kirst, Mathias Forster, et al.: Das große Heinz Rühmann Buch''. Naumann & Göbel / VEMAG, Cologne o.J.,

References

External links

 
 
 Fan site 
 Rühmann biographical timeline German Historical Museum 
 Heinz Rühmann memorial book 
 Heinz Rühmann brief biography and filmography 
 Bibliography and photographs

1902 births
1994 deaths
Actors from Essen
People from the Rhine Province
German male film actors
Film directors from North Rhine-Westphalia
German male silent film actors
Grand Crosses with Star and Sash of the Order of Merit of the Federal Republic of Germany
20th-century German male actors
German Film Award winners